Yeşilköy is a town in Dörtyol district of Hatay Province, Turkey. Turkish state highway   is to the west, Çukurova Motorway is to the east and Dörtyol is to the south of the town. Yeşilköy is almost merged to Dörtyol. The population of Yeşilköy was 10482 as of 2012. Yeşilköy was declared a seat of township in 1968. The main agricultural crops are citrus and vegetables. The town is in a flourishing industrial area. Services to summer houses around the town also constitute a part of town revenue.

References

Populated places in Hatay Province
Populated coastal places in Turkey
Towns in Turkey
Dörtyol District